Illiana is the general area around the border between the U.S. states of Illinois and Indiana, containing the eastern edge of Illinois and the western edge of Indiana. The word is a portmanteau of the two states' names.

The name also applies specifically to Illiana, Illinois, which is the name given to that part of the Indiana town of State Line that protrudes west across the border into Illinois. Illiana is also the namesake of the Illiana Motor Speedway.

Cities 
Major Illiana cities include the Chicago metropolitan area and Hammond, Indiana.  Danville, Illinois is a significant community in Central Illiana, while the cities of Terre Haute and Evansville lie close to the line farther south.

Colleges and universities
The colleges listed below may not be directly on the Illiana line, but are significant to the communities along the border:

In Illinois:
 Danville Area Community College (DACC), Danville
 University of Illinois at Urbana-Champaign (UIUC), Urbana-Champaign

In Indiana:
 Indiana State University, Terre Haute
 Purdue University, West Lafayette
 Rose-Hulman Institute of Technology, Terre Haute
 Saint Mary of the Woods College, Saint Mary of the Woods
 University of Evansville, Evansville
 University of Southern Indiana, Evansville

Highways
 Illiana Expressway (proposed and cancelled)

References

Regions of Illinois
Regions of Indiana